The 1900 Republican National Convention was held June 19 to June 21 in the Exposition Auditorium, Philadelphia, Pennsylvania. The Exposition Auditorium was located south of the University of Pennsylvania, and the later Convention Hall was constructed along the building's east wall. It was demolished in 2006.

Each state was allotted two delegates per electoral vote, and territories were granted from two to six delegates. Altogether, there were 926 delegates and an equal number of alternates.

Mark Hanna opened the convention. He proposed that Senator Edward O. Wolcott of Colorado serve as temporary chairman. The purpose of Wolcott's selection was to show that the party had overcome its divisiveness of 1896, in which the Colorado delegation had walked out of the Republican convention. Senator Henry Cabot Lodge of Massachusetts served as the convention's permanent chairman.

President William McKinley was unanimously nominated for reelection: no candidate ran against him, although Admiral George Dewey considered a run. 

Governor Theodore Roosevelt of New York, who was himself a delegate, was nominated for vice president by a vote of 925 to zero, his vote alone abstaining.

State delegates

The 1900 Republican National Convention included a historic first for the Republican Party: Jennie L. McCargar Jones of Salt Lake City, Utah, and Susan Henderson West of Lewiston, Idaho, served as alternate delegates.

Speakers
The 1900 convention had fewer speakers than a modern convention typically has due to lack of TV and even radio at this time. There were however the following speakers:

June 19
Prayer by Rev. James Gray Bolton D.D.
Mark Hanna
Edward O. Wolcott

June 20
Prayer by Rev. Charles M. Boswell D.D.
Henry Cabot Lodge

June 21
Prayer by Most Rev. P.J. Ryan, Archbishop of Philadelphia
Joseph B. Foraker, U.S. Senator from Ohio, McKinley nominating speech
Theodore Roosevelt, Governor of New York and McKinley seconding speech
Balloting: President McKinley was nominated unanimously. This was the first time this happened since President Grant was nominated in 1872.
John W. Yerkes, IRS Commissioner from Kentucky
George A. Knight, Attorney and Businessman from California
James A. Mount, Governor of Indiana 
Wanting to get rid of him, Boss Platt, convinced New York governor Theodore Roosevelt, hero of the hour, to allow himself to be nominated for Vice President. 
Lafayette Young, Newspaper reporter from Iowa, Roosevelt nominating speech
M.J. Murray, local politician from Massachusetts, Roosevelt seconding speech
General James M. Ashton, lawyer and soldier from Washington, Roosevelt seconding speech
Balloting: Governor Roosevelt was nominated for Vice President, though he abstained from voting on his own nomination.
Chauncey Depew

Vice Presidential nomination

Vice Presidential candidates

Candidates considered 

Vice President Garret Hobart had announced in September 1899 that he would not seek re-election due to declining health. In the event, he died in office on November 21, 1899, leaving the party the task of choosing a running mate for McKinley. 

Entering the convention, many had expected that the ticket would consist of President McKinley and New York Governor Theodore Roosevelt. However, Ohio Senator Mark Hanna maneuvered to keep Roosevelt off the ballot, instead proposing Navy Secretary John D. Long of Massachusetts or Iowa Representative Jonathan P. Dolliver. Without the support of McKinley, Hanna's efforts fell short. Roosevelt himself did not particularly want to abandon his position of governor, but he desired to run for president in 1904 and when the party nominated him, he accepted the position. Roosevelt's nomination was spearheaded by bosses Matthew Quay of Pennsylvania and Thomas C. Platt of New York, the latter of whom wished to find a different job for the reformist Roosevelt.

Vice Presidential Balloting / 3rd Day of Convention (June 21, 1900)

Platform
The Republican party supported the current administration's actions in the Philippines, while the Democratic party promoted "anti-imperialism".

See also
History of the United States Republican Party
List of Republican National Conventions
U.S. presidential nomination convention
1900 United States presidential election
1900 Democratic National Convention

References

Bibliography

 Richard C. Bain and Judith H. Parris, Convention Decisions and Voting Records (Washington DC: Brookings Institution, 1973), pp. 158–161.

External links
 Republican Party platform of 1900 at The American Presidency Project
 McKinley acceptance address at The American Presidency Project
 Official proceedings of the twelfth Republican National Convention, held in ... Philadelphia, June, 19, 20 and 21, 1900

1900 United States presidential election
Republican National Conventions
Republican National Convention, 1900
Political conventions in Philadelphia
Republican National Convention
1900 conferences
June 1900 events